"I Can't Love You Enough" is a song written by Troy Seals and Max D. Barnes, and recorded by American country music artists Conway Twitty and Loretta Lynn as a duet. It was released in May 1977 as the first single from their album Dynamic Duo. The song peaked at number 2 on the Billboard Hot Country Singles chart. It also reached number 1 on the RPM Country Tracks chart in Canada.

Chart performance

References

1977 singles
Conway Twitty songs
Loretta Lynn songs
Songs written by Max D. Barnes
Songs written by Troy Seals
Song recordings produced by Owen Bradley
Male–female vocal duets
MCA Records singles
1977 songs